Ostrovo   (meaning "island" in Serbian) is a village in the municipality of Veliko Gradište, Serbia. It is a peninsula, formerly a river island. According to the 2002 census, the village has a population of 300 people.

References

Populated places in Braničevo District